Ratos AB (portmanteau for Ragnar and Torsten Söderberg) is a Swedish private equity company founded in 1934 and still controlled by the Söderberg family. Ratos is listed on the Stockholm Stock Exchange.

History
The Söderberg brothers established Ratos in the 1933, as a holding company for the family's growing enterprises. At the time the family was owners of Söderberg & Haak. Ratos developed with extensive ownership in companies such as Stora Kopparberg, Gränges and Esselte in addition to a wholly owned steel division. It was listed on the stock exchange in 1954.

In 1979 the steel division, that at the time was called Tibnor, was sold to the state owned SSAB as part of the re-organization of the crisis hit steel industry. After that the company expanded into new areas, including a larger number of transport companies, the hotel chain Scandic Hotels and the plumbing chain Dahl International. During this period Sven Söderberg (1928-2004) was President and CEO.

The financial crisis hit Ratos with reduced profits in 1992 and Urban Jansson was appointed new CEO and the subsidiaries were either floated on the stock exchange or sold. After Arne Karlsson took over as CEO, Ratos was transformed to a private equity company.

Magnus Agervald was appointed as CEO of Ratos in July 2016, replacing acting CEO Lars Johansson.

In 2019, Ratos sold the Adelswärdska house, the building on Drottninggatan in Stockholm where the head office is located. Buyers were the State Property Agency.  The reason for the sale was the increasingly increased safety requirements in the environment, as the building lies between the Sagerska palace (the Prime Minister's Housing) and Rosenbad (Government Offices) and the area was increasingly blocked off. The property was purchased by Söderberg & Haak in 1938 and later became rated. Ratos may dispose of the building until 2021.

Holdings

Industry
AH Industries - metal components and services to the wind power, offshore and marine industries. (stake 66%)
Camfil - clean air technology and air filters. (stake 30%)
Contex Group - developer and manufacturer. (stake 98%)
DIAB - manufactures and develops core materials for composite structures. (stake 94%)
EuroMaint - maintenance companies and offers maintenance services to the rail transport sector and industry. (stake 100%)
GS-Hydro - supplier of non-welded piping systems. (stake 100%)
HL Display - supplier of products and systems for merchandising and in-store communication. (stake 29%)
Inwido - manufactures and sells windows and doors to consumers, construction companies and modular home manufacturers. (stake 96%)
Jøtul - manufacturer of stoves and fireplaces. (stake 63%)
Lindab - development, production, marketing and distribution of systems and products in sheet metal and steel for the construction industry. (stake 22%)
MCC - offers complete climate comfort systems. (stake 100%)
Medisize - manufacturer specialised in medical devices for delivery and administration of drugs and pharmaceutical packaging. (stake 93%)
Superfos - develops, produces and sells injection moulded packaging for the food, paint and chemical industries. (stake 33%)

Service
Anticimex - services for healthy and safe indoor environments. (stake 85%)
 Bisnode - provider of digital business information. (stake 70%)

Consumer goods
Arcus Gruppen - wine and spirits producer. (stake 83%)
Hafa Bathroom Group - bathroom furnishing. (stake 100%)

Other holdings
BTJ Group - supplier of media products and information services to libraries, universities, companies and organisations. (stake 66%)
IK Investment Partners - Ratos has invested in four funds: 1989 (closed), 1994 (closed), 1997 and 2000.
Overseas Telecom - telecom operations in developing countries. (stake 9%, voting rights 19%)

References

External links
 Corporate web site

Companies based in Stockholm
Private equity firms of Sweden
Holding companies of Sweden
1933 establishments in Sweden
Financial services companies established in 1933
Companies listed on Nasdaq Stockholm